Qajariyeh-ye Yek (also Romanized as Qajarīyeh-ye Yek and Qajarīyeh Yek) is a village in Esmailiyeh Rural District, in the Central District of Ahvaz County, Khuzestan Province, Iran. At the 2006 census, its population was 800, in 149 families.

References 

Populated places in Ahvaz County